A list of films produced by the Bollywood film industry based in Mumbai in 1999. Salman Khan was the lead actor in the top 3 highest-grossing films of that year.

Box office collection

Top 10 highest grossing Bollywood films of 1999.

Released films

References

External links
 Bollywood films of 1999 at the Internet Movie Database

1999
Lists of 1999 films by country or language
1999 films
1999 in Indian cinema